Klinča Sela is a municipality in Zagreb County, Croatia. According to the 2001 census, there are 4,927 inhabitants.

References

Populated places in Zagreb County
Municipalities of Croatia